Melville Ezra Ingalls (1842–1914), commonly abbreviated M. E. Ingalls, was a Massachusetts state legislator who went on to become president of the Cleveland, Cincinnati, Chicago and St. Louis Railroad (the Big Four Railroad).

Career
Ingalls was born on September 6, 1842 in Harrison, Maine, where he worked on the family farm until he began teaching at the age of 16. After graduating from Harvard Law School in 1863, Ingalls began practicing law in Gray, ME before moving to Boston, Massachusetts, where he became an expert in corporate law, specializing in transportation lines. In 1871, he was retained as counsel to the Cincinnati and Lafayette Railroad and would eventually become its president. After multiple consolidations under his watch, the company became known as the Big Four Railroad.

Positions held
 President of the Chesapeake & Ohio Railroad until 1900
 President of the Cleveland, Cincinnati, Chicago and St. Louis until 1905, Chairman of the Board until 1910
 President of the Kentucky Central Railroad (January, 1881 - October, 1883)
 President of the Cincinnati Northern
 President of the Merchants' National Bank in Cincinnati, OH
 Co-founder and President of the Cincinnati Art Museum
 President of the National Civic Federation in 1905
 President of the Queen City Club in Cincinnati, OH

On July 11, 1914, Ingalls died at his summer home in Hot Springs, Virginia, from heart disease after undergoing treatment for an ulcerated tooth. He was buried in Cincinnati, Ohio.

Ingalls also organized the Joint Traffic Association, which was shut down by the United States Supreme Court and co-founded the Cincinnati Technical School. He is the grandfather of David Sinton Ingalls.

He financed the construction of the Ingalls Building in Cincinnati, which was the world's first reinforced concrete skyscraper in 1903. The town of Ingalls, Indiana is named in his honor.

See also
 89th Massachusetts General Court (1868)

References

1842 births
1914 deaths
19th-century American railroad executives
20th-century American railroad executives
Harvard Law School alumni
Farmers from Maine
People from Cumberland County, Maine

People from Hot Springs, Virginia
People associated with the Cincinnati Art Museum